Neil McPhail was a New Zealand rugby union team coach from 1961 to 1965.

Career 
McPhail coached the New Zealand rugby union team from 1961 to 1965 for a total of 20 tests.

References 

New Zealand national rugby union team coaches
New Zealand rugby union coaches